Leo Birenberg is an American composer and orchestrator for film and television.

Career 
Born in Kentucky and raised in Chicago, Birenberg studied composition at NYU and USC. While there, he started composing his first scores in collaboration with his roommate, filmmaker Jeremy Reitz.

After graduating, he had a chance encounter with composer Christophe Beck, who ended up taking Birenberg on as a mentee. Under Beck's tutelage, Birenberg worked as the score coordinator on numerous large projects, including The Muppets, Pitch Perfect, Runner Runner, and Frozen. In 2014, Birenberg started composing additional music for Beck’s films, including Muppets Most Wanted, Edge of Tomorrow, and Ant-Man.

In 2014, Birenberg also started composing his own original scores for television shows, including Next Time on Lonny, The Britishes, Big Time in Hollywood, FL, and the YouTube Red series Sing It!

In 2016, Birenberg received an email from producer Eric Appel, and asked to compose music for the then-upcoming FX series Son of Zorn. Upon approaching the series, he took the original up-beat synth-heavy score and replaced it with something that spanned a vast array of musical styles, sampling the styles of country music and church choirs. In 2017, Birenberg released a soundtrack for the show. That same year, Birenberg also started composing music for the Seeso original series Take My Wife. He also composed the score for the 2017 comedy F the Prom.

In 2018, Birenberg co-composed YouTube and Sony series Cobra Kai with composer Zach Robinson. They also scored the second season, airing in April 2019. In addition, he recently scored the music for Dreamworks' Kung Fu Panda: The Paws of Destiny.

In 2019, Leo composed the music for Hulu's Pen15. He also recently scored Adult Swim's animated series Tigtone'' and Tribeca Film Festival selection Plus One.

Filmography

Films

Television

References

External links 
 
 Official Website

Year of birth missing (living people)
American film score composers
American male film score composers
American television composers
Living people
Male television composers